Germanus IV, (1790 – 16 September 1853) served two terms as Ecumenical Patriarch of Constantinople, from 1842 to 1845 and from 1852 until his death in 1853.

In 1826–1830, he was bishop of Vidin, then bishop of Drama until 1835, when he was appointed bishop of Derkoi. He was elected to the patriarchal throne for the first time in 1842, and held the post until 1845, when he was succeeded by Meletius III. Restored to the throne in 1852, he occupied it until his death the next year.

During his patriarchy, he especially took care of the poor. He founded many churches, schools, libraries and orphanages. His name was particularly associated with the education of the Orthodox clergy, as he was the founder of the Theological School of Halki in the monastery of the Holy Trinity. The school operated regularly until 1971, when it was closed by law, and brought forth many theologists, priests, bishops and patriarchs of note.

Sources
Ecumenical Patriarchate

External links 
 Official website of the Theological School of Halki 

1853 deaths
19th-century Ecumenical Patriarchs of Constantinople
1790 births